The Sunnyside Garden Arena was a popular boxing venue. The old red brick arena, at the southwest corner of 45th Street and Queens Boulevard, in Sunnyside, Queens, New York City, seated about 2,500. It consisted of two parallel gables perpendicular to the street fronted by a lower, flat-roofed entry.  Across the entry was a large neon sign and below that, just above the main entrance, was a large clock.

History
Built in the 1920s, the building is variously reported to have been either a private tennis club and/or the personal tennis court and carriage house of millionaire Jay Gould II.

In the mid forties, the building was sold to Harry Jordan Lee of Long Beach, New York, who partnered with Manny Heicklen to open it as a boxing and wrestling venue in 1947. Heicklen eventually bought out Lee and remained in charge until his death in 1969. The reins then passed to promoter Mike Rosenberg until the arena was sold to Mike Prudenti of Astoria in 1973. This apparently didn't work out and the arena was closed for two years until late 1975.  Under promoters Nick Anesi and Vic Manni, it lasted until 1977,  when it was replaced by a Wendy’s which still stands on the site.

In its heyday, the Sunnyside Garden Arena played host to such boxing greats as Floyd Patterson, Anthony Pugliese, Tony Canzoneri, Al Singer, Ruby Goldstein, and Billy Petrolle.  For some years it was home to the Golden Gloves tournaments. Famous wrestlers battled there too, notably Jim Londos (the Golden Greek), Stan Zybysko, Strangler Lewis, Nature Boy Buddy Rogers, Haystacks Calhoun, and Bruno Sammartino. The DuMont Television Network aired Boxing From Sunnyside Gardens from September 1949 to 1950.

Sunnyside Garden was also the site of political rallies, including a 1960 visit by then-senator John F. Kennedy on his presidential campaign tour. Robert F. Kennedy is reported to have stumped there in his 1964 senatorial campaign.

The Sunnyside Garden was one of a few boxing arenas in New York City to survive into the television era, with most others being closed and demolished in the 1950s. While generally considered the last operational boxing club in New York, St. Nicholas Arena (which ceased hosting boxing matches in 1962) remained standing as a building longer. The Sunnyside Garden Arena managed to profit and its fights were shown on Channel 5 on Friday nights. The television exposure that channel 5 had given arenas such as St. Nicholas and the Sunnyside Garden kept the arenas in operation in an era when many of their contemporaries were losing spectators to televised boxing matches. In time, the viewing public lost its appetite for both televised and in-person boxing in the early 1960s with high-profile deaths and the concurrent rise of pro football as a spectator sport.

The last show at Sunnyside took place on June 24, 1977, and the building was demolished in December of the same year.  The Daily News reported on December 6, that the payloader at the demolition site, having fallen partly into the basement after collapsing a basement was vandalized, as was a second payloader sent to rescue the first.

Felt Forum, now the Hulu Theater, opened along with the current Madison Square Garden in 1968, absorbing most of the remaining major boxing bouts in the city from the older, outdated boxing arenas.

References

Additional sources

 Anonymous. "Comeback For Sunnyside Garden". QUEENS TRIBUNE. 15 AUG. 1975.
 Anonymous. "Fight Game Comes Back". SUNDAY NEWS. 19 OCT. 1975.
 Anonymous. "Sunnyside Landmark Makes Room For Fast-Food Hamburger Chain". WOODSIDE HERALD. 9 DEC. 1977.
 D'O'Brian, Joseph. "The Business of Boxing". AMERICAN HERITAGE. OCT. 1991. 
 Ferretti, Fred. "Narcotics Are Complicating Sunnyside's". THE NEW YORK TIMES. 6 JUN. 1971.
 Gergen, Joe. "Bobby Cassidy Fights On And On And On: One man's hard-knock life-in and out of the ring". THE NEWSDAY MAGAZINE. 23 MAR. 1986.
 Gross, Kenneth. "Once It Was Known as Bliss". NEWSDAY. 21 OCT. 1979.
 Hirshon, Nicholas. "Monumental Fight". DAILY NEWS/NYDailyNews.com. 23 NOV. 2010.
 Ingrassia, Michele. "Inside the Ring or Out, There's Always Action at Sunnyside. THE NEW YORK TIMES. 16 APR. 1972.
 LeDuff, Charlie. "An Effort to Recapture The Old Allure of Boxing". NEW YORK TIMES. 25 NOV. 2000.
 Matthews, Wallace. "No Longer on the Ropes: Goodman, Gutkowski have put punch back into Felt Forum boxing". NEWSDAY. 23 NOV. 1986.
 Morales, Tina. "Onetime Farm Town Grows With Location". NEWSDAY. SUNDAY 4 FEB. 1990.
 Rabin, Bernard. "Demolition Rig Vandalized". DAILY NEWS. 6 DEC. 1977
 Rabin, Bernard. "Sunnyside Garden Going Down for Count". DAILY NEWS. 4 DEC. 1977.
 Shapiro, Hal. "50-Year Old Boxing Arena To Get a New Lease on Life". LI PRESS. 21 OCT. 1973.
 http://boxrec.com/media/index.php/Sunnyside_Garden

Sports venues in Queens, New York
Boxing venues in New York City
1920s architecture in the United States
1920s establishments in New York City
1977 disestablishments in New York (state)
Sports venues demolished in 1977
Demolished sports venues in New York (state)
Sunnyside, Queens